Constantin Dardan was a Moldovan politician.

Biography 

Constantin Dardan served as mayor of Chişinău (1938).

External links 
 Primari ai oraşului Chişinău

Notes

Mayors of Chișinău